The Stockholm Open (currently sponsored by Intrum) is an indoor tennis event on the ATP Tour played at the Kungliga tennishallen in Stockholm, Sweden. The tournament is owned by The Royal Lawn Tennis Club of Stockholm, SALK (Stockholm Public Lawn Tennis Club) and Tennis Stockholm.

The first Stockholm Open was held in 1969 and it has been played each year ever since, except for 2020 when it was cancelled due to the corona pandemic. The tournament is played on indoor hard-court and features both men's singles and doubles tournament. The event was held on carpet courts in 1975, 1979, and 1980 as a short-lived women's competition, as well as in 1989 and 1990.

Originally played in November, the tournament was moved to October in 2001.

History
In March 1969 the World Championship Tennis organization made a request to former tennis player Sven Davidson to organize a tournament in Sweden. This led to the inaugural edition of the Stockholm Open in November 1969 in Kungliga tennishallen in Stockholm. It has been held there ever since except for the years 1989 to 1994 when it was held in the Ericsson Globe Arena. 
Between 1970 and 1989 it was a major ranking tournament of the Grand Prix Tennis Tour apart from in 1971 when it was held as part of the WCT circuit.

From 1990 until 1994 it was an ATP Championship Series Single Week event. Since 1995, the tournament has been downgraded from Super 9 status (which replaced the ATP Championship Series, Single Week) status offering $1.72 million in prize money to ATP World Tour 250 series level with €711,275 (2019) prize money.

Past finals

Men

Singles

Doubles

Women

Singles

Doubles

References

External links

Official Stockholm Open website 
ATP – Tournament profile
Stockholm Open at SVT's open archive 

 
Tennis tournaments in Sweden
Indoor tennis tournaments
Hard court tennis tournaments
Recurring sporting events established in 1969
Grand Prix tennis
October sporting events
1969 establishments in Sweden
International sports competitions in Stockholm
Autumn events in Sweden